Croydon High School is a private day school for girls located near Croydon, London, England. It is one of the original schools founded by the Girls' Day School Trust.

History
The school was founded in 1874 in Wellesley Road just north of the centre of Croydon, and the first Headmistress was Dorinda Neligan.  The school was evacuated to Bradden, Northamptonshire during World War II. The present building in Old Farleigh Road, Selsdon, South Croydon, Surrey was opened in 1966. It has been an independent girls school aiming to educate young girls since its foundation in 1874.

Houses
Girls entering the school are assigned to one of the four houses.

Weekend programmes
The Japanese Saturday School of London, a weekend Japanese programme, uses the Girls' School as its Croydon Campus (クロイドン校舎 Kuroidon Kōsha).

Notable former pupils

Mary Baines (1932–2020), palliative care physician
Dame Lilian Braithwaite DBE (1873–1948), actress (née Florence Lilian Braithwaite)
Judy Buxton (b. 1949), actress
Elsa Gye (1881–1943), suffragette organiser with the Women's Social and Political Union
Catherine Christian (1901–1985), novelist and supporter of the Girl Guide movement
Dame Jane Drew DBE (1911–1996), architect and town planner (née Joyce Beverly Drew)
Jacqueline du Pré OBE (1945–1987), musician, cellist
Josephine Elder (1895–1988), children's author (née Olive Gwendoline Potter)
Clare Gilbert, professor and researcher who focuses on blindness in children
Jessie Gilbert (1987–2006), chess player
Barbara Jones (1912–1978), artist, writer and mural painter
Yootha Joyce (b. 1927), actress
Elizabeth Laird (b. 1943), children's author
Kate Evelyn Luard (1872-1962) Decorated 1st World War nurse
 
Sandra Howard (b. 1940), novelist, former model (under the name Sandra Paul), and wife of Michael Howard
Perin Jamsetjee Mistri (1913–1989), Indian architect
Susanna Reid (b. 1970), Good Morning Britain presenter
Anneka Rice (b. 1958), TV presenter (née Anne Rice)
Dame Marion Roe DBE (b. 1936), Conservative politician
Wendy Savage (b. 1935), obstetrician and gynaecologist
Henderina Klaassen Scott (1862–1929), pioneer of time lapse photography in botany
Beatrice Seear, Baroness Seear (1913–1997), known as Nancy Seear, social scientist and politician
Joanna Shapland (b. 1950), criminologist, forensic psychologist, and academic
Jill Tweedie (1936–1993), novelist and journalist
Charlotte Deane (b. 1975), bioinformatician and Head of the Department of Statistics at the University of Oxford
Gabrielle Bertin, Baroness Bertin (b. 1978), Conservative aide and life peer
Susan Ma (b. 1988), The Apprentice contestant and founder of Tropic Skincare
Susan Wrigglesworth(1954-1996), British fencer who competed at the 1972, 1976 and 1980 Summer Olympics

Headmistresses
Past headmistresses
1874–1901: Dorinda Neligan (1833–1914)
1902–1924: Marion Leahy
1925 (Spring term): Eleanor Roper (acting headmistress)
1925–1939: Ella Ransford
1939–1960: Margaret F. Adams
1960–1974: Elsa Cameron
1974–1979: Agnes McMaster
1979–1990: Agnes Mark
1990–1997: Pauline Davies
1998–2007: Lorna M. Ogilvie 
2007–2010: Zelma Braganza
2010–2016: Debbie Leonard
2016–2022: Emma Pattison
2022–present: Annabel Davies

References

External links
School Website
Croydon High Sports Club
Profile on GDST website
Profile on ISC website
ISI Inspection Reports

Private schools in the London Borough of Croydon
Private girls' schools in London
Educational institutions established in 1874
Schools of the Girls' Day School Trust
Member schools of the Girls' Schools Association
1874 establishments in England